Popper may refer to:

 Popper (surname), including a list of people with the name
 Jalapeño popper, a type of food
 Poppers, a slang term for alkyl nitrites inhaled for recreational purposes
 Poppers, a brand of frozen food owned by Heinz
 Popper (see Popping (dance)), a person dancing in a certain street/funk style
 Popper, a floating fishing popper or fly with a cupped or flat, forward-facing indentation that splashes the surface of the water with a popping sound when tugged
 A hip pop musician
 Popper, a ball that rises sharply from the pitch when bowled ('pops up') in cricket
 Popper, a juicebox (Australian English)
 Popper buttons, another term for "snap fasteners"
 Poppers, an alternate name for tearaway pants in British English
 Party popper, a small 'toy' filled with confetti streamers and a small explosive charge to release them
 Bang snaps, small novelty fireworks that produce a loud snapping sound when thrown on the ground
 Poppers, a slang term for Papadum, an Indian crisp wafer or cracker
 Poppers, a cartoon strip by Jerry Mills
 Eye popper, a dome-shaped children's toy